Tony Smith (born 1 August 1966) is a former Australian rules footballer who played with Sydney Swans in the Victorian Football League (VFL).

Smith spent his early years in the southern Riverina town of Finley (NSW) before moving to Queensland with his family at age 11. He only played a few games for Morningside in the Queensland Australian Football League (QAFL) in 1985 before he was approached by the Swans. He had just joined the Queensland Police Force but on the encouragement of his father, who had been a South Melbourne supporter, decided to make the move to Sydney. A ruckman, Smith made his senior debut against Melbourne in round 17 of the 1986 season.  Smith only played a total of 17 games in three seasons. Due to business commitments, he left the Swans at the end of the 1988 season, to captain-coach Sydney club North Shore.

After retiring from football, Smith became a successful property developer and promoted the schoolies week on the Gold Coast.  In January 2015 he was charged with retaliation against a witness, attempting to pervert the course of justice and attempted fraud.

References

External links 

1966 births
Living people
Sydney Swans players
Morningside Australian Football Club players
North Shore Australian Football Club players
Australian rules footballers from Queensland
Australian real estate businesspeople